Projective may refer to

Mathematics 
Projective geometry
Projective space
Projective plane
Projective variety
Projective linear group
Projective module
Projective line
Projective object
Projective transformation
Projective hierarchy
Projective connection
Projective Hilbert space
Projective morphism
Projective polyhedron
Projective resolution

Psychology 
Projective test
Projective techniques

See also
 Projection (disambiguation)
 Projector (disambiguation)
 Project (disambiguation)
 Proform, which covers proadjective
 Adjective
 Injective
 Surjective